The 27th American Society of Cinematographers Awards were held on February 10, 2013, at the Hollywood & Highland Ray Dolby Ballroom, honoring the best cinematographers of film and television in 2012.

Winners and nominees

Film

Outstanding Achievement in Cinematography in Theatrical Release
 Roger Deakins, ASC, BSC – Skyfall
 Danny Cohen – Les Misérables
 Janusz Kamiński – Lincoln
 Seamus McGarvey – Anna Karenina
 Claudio Miranda, ASC – Life of Pi

Television

Outstanding Achievement in Cinematography in Regular Series Half-Hour
 Bradford Lipson – Wilfred (Episode: "Truth") (FX)
 Ken Glassing – Ben and Kate (Episode: "Guitar Face") (Fox)
 Michael Goi, ASC – The New Normal (Episode: "Pilot") (NBC)
 Peter Levy, ASC, ACS – House of Lies (Episode: "Gods of Dangerous Financial Instruments") (Showtime)
 Michael Price – Happy Endings (Episode: "Four Weddings and a Funeral (Minus Three Weddings and One Funeral)") (ABC)

Outstanding Achievement in Cinematography in Regular Series One-Hour
 Balazs Bolygo, HSC – Hunted (Episode: "Mort") (Cinemax) (TIE)
 Kramer Morgenthau, ASC – Game of Thrones (Episode: "The North Remembers") (HBO) (TIE)
 Chris Manley, ASC – Mad Men (Episode: "The Phantom") (AMC)
 David Moxness, CSC – Fringe (Episode: "Letters of Transit") (Fox)
 Michael Spragg – Strike Back (Episode: "Episode 11") (Cinemax)
 David Stockton, ASC – Alcatraz (Episode: "Pilot") (Fox)

Outstanding Achievement in Cinematography in Motion Picture/Miniseries
 Florian Hoffmeister – Great Expectations (PBS)
 Michael Goi, ASC – American Horror Story: Asylum (Episode: "I Am Anne Frank", Part 2) (FX)
 Arthur Reinhart, PSC – Hatfields & McCoys (History)
 Rogier Stoffers, ASC, NSC – Hemingway & Gellhorn (HBO)

Other awards
 Lifetime Achievement Award: Dean Semler, ASC, ACS
 Career Achievement in Television: Rodney Charters, ASC, CSC
 International Award: Robby Müller, NSC, BVK
 Presidents Award: Curtis Clark, ASC
 Bud Stone Award of Distinction: Milt Shefter

References

2013
2013 film awards
2013 television awards
American
2013 in American cinema